The following is a list of football stadiums in Botswana, ordered by capacity.

List

See also
List of association football stadiums by capacity
List of African stadiums by capacity

References
World Stadiums – Stadiums in Botswana. Retrieved 21 June 2012
worldstadia.com:: Stadiums in Botswana. Retrieved 21 June 2012
Botswana Football

 
Botswana
Football stadiums